Eblana is the name of an ancient Irish settlement.

Eblana may also refer to:

 Eblan (or Eblana), a monarchy in the video game Final Fantasy IV ruled by King and Queen Geraldine

 Teresa J. Rooney (1840-1911), author of patriotic works under the pseudonym Eblana.